Nossa Senhora do Rosário, Portuguese for Our Lady of the Rosary, may also refer to the following places:

Brazil
Nossa Senhora do Rosário, Santa Maria

Cape Verde
Nossa Senhora do Rosário (Ribeira Grande), a parish in the municipality of Ribeira Grande, Cape Verde

Portugal
Nossa Senhora do Rosário, a civil parish on the island of São Miguel, Azores, Portugal
Nossa Senhora do Rosário, also known as Topo, a civil parish on the island of São Jorge, Azores, Portugal

See also
Church of Nossa Senhora do Rosario, Angola
Church of Nossa Senhora do Rosário (Calheta)